Rälla tall is a village in the municipality of Borgholm situated on the island of Öland and is part of the province Kalmar län in Sweden. The village has 72 inhabitants (2005).

Populated places in Borgholm Municipality